IV Life is the fourth studio album by American West Coast hip hop artist King Tee. It was released on March 28, 1995 via MCA Records, making it his first album on the label after his split with Capitol Records. Production was handled by several record producers, including DJ Pooh, Moe Love, TR Love, Grand Mixer DXT, E-Swift, DJ Broadway, Mark Sparks, Rashad, Thayod, Da Mic Profesah, Nikke Nicole, SLJ, and King Tee himself. It also features guest appearances from Xzibit, Breeze, and Tha Alkaholiks. The album spawned three singles: "Dippin'"/"Duck", "Way Out There"/"Super Nigga" and "Free Style Ghetto"/"Let's Get It On", but only "Dippin'" made it to Billboard charts, reaching number 46 on the Hot Rap Songs.

The album peaked at number 171 on the US Billboard 200, number 23 on the Top R&B/Hip-Hop Albums chart, number 10 on the Heatseekers Albums chart.

Track listing

Sample credits
You Can't See Me
"Rule of Mind" by 9th Creation
"Hot Sex" by A Tribe Called Quest
Super Nigga
"The Look of Love" by Carmen McRae
"Super Nigga" by Richard Pryor
Duck
"Blind Alley" by The Emotions
Dippin'
"Cherish" by The Four Tops
"Cussin', Cryin' and Carryin' On" by Ike & Tina Turner
3 Strikes Ya' Out
"Sing a Simple Song" by Sly & The Family Stone
"Threnody for Sharon Tate" by Freddie Hubbard
Down Ass Loc
"Maracas Beach" by Grover Washington, Jr.
Free Style Ghetto
"Theme from Mahogany" by Diana Ross
Way Out There
"Superman Theme" by Leon Klatzkin
"She's Strange" by Cameo
Advertisement
"Jungle Boogie" by Kool & the Gang

Personnel

 Roger McBride – main artist, producer (tracks: 2-4, 6, 11-12)
 Mark S. Jordan – featured artist & producer (track 2)
 James Rashad Coes – featured artist & producer (track 2) 
 Eric Brooks – featured artist (tracks: 3, 7)
 Rico Smith – featured artist (track 7)
 James Robinson – featured artist (track 7)
 Alvin Nathaniel Joiner – featured artist (track 7)
 M.C. Breeze – featured artist (track 7)
 Nicole Miller – featured artist & producer (track 9)
 James Broadway – producer (tracks: 1, 3, 4, 6, 7, 11, 12), co-producer (track 8)
 Johnathan Marc Blount – producer (track 1)
 Maurice Russell Smith – producer (track 5)
 Trevor Randolph – producer (track 5)
 Eric James Banks – producer (track 7)
 Da Mic Profesah – producer (track 8)
 Shafiq "SLJ" Husayn – producer (track 10)
 Derek Showard – producer (track 10)
 Bob Raylove – executive producer
 Dave Rideau – mixing (track 12)
 Victor "Vic C." Conception – remixing (track 12)
 Tom Baker – mastering

Album singles

Chart positions
Album

Singles

References

External links

1995 albums
King Tee albums
MCA Records albums
Albums produced by DJ Pooh